Stenagra multipunctata is a moth in the family Cossidae, and the only species in the genus Stenagra. It is found in Nigeria.

References

Natural History Museum Lepidoptera generic names catalog

Endemic fauna of Nigeria
Metarbelinae
Moths described in 1920